Cromer Academy (formerly Cromer High School, Sports College, Cromer Institute of Science) is a 11- 16 secondary school with academy status in Cromer, Norfolk. It is part of the Inspiration Trust federation.

Description
The school is coeducational and students are admitted without regard to ability. It is part of a partnership of schools known as the Cromer Campus, with the neighbouring Suffield Park Infants and Cromer Junior School. Many pupils go through all three schools in the campus.

In December 2016, the school was rated "good" by Ofsted. They found a smaller than average comprehensive school, with just 495 students who are mainly white British, with a below average number from minority ethnic groups and similarly a lower than average number of students with Special Educational Needs.

On 1 June 2020, Darren Hollingsworth replaced Stewart Little as the school's principal.

Curriculum and Enrichment
Virtually all maintained schools and academies follow the National Curriculum, and are inspected by Ofsted on how well they succeed in delivering a 'broad and balanced curriculum'. The school has to decide whether Key Stage 3 contains years 7, 8 and 9- or whether and year 9 should be in Key Stage 4 so the students will just study their chosen GCSE exam subjects for the final three years. Cromer has selected the three year Key Stage 3 so in Years 7-9 all students study the core curriculum of math, English, and science, with art, computer science, design technology, drama, geography, history, the modern language (French or Spanish, music, philosophy, and physical education. There are sessions covering personal, social, and health issues.

The library is at the heart of the school, and literacy is strongly promoted. Their external visits and activity weeks function to broaden the student's horizons. Ofsted judged the school to 'outstanding management' and commented on the schools efforts to stretch the more able and support the weak. Bullying was non-existent and pupils felt safe and cared for.
In Key Stage 4 students still do the 30 period week, and lessons are still 55 minutes long but there is an element of choice. Half the week is spent studying the core subjects of math, double English and science with a compulsory language, and a compulsory Humanity in addition. These are the subjects demanded to achieve the English Baccalaureate. They can choose two optional subjects from art, performing arts, music, design technology (DT), computer science, sport, photography, philosophy and not psychology, and Statistics or further sport.

Community involvement
1895 (Cromer) Air Training Corps and Cromer Platoon, Britannia Coy., Norfolk Army Cadet Force are based at Cromer Academy.

Notable students 
Automotive journalist (BBC, ITV, Sky) Jess Shanahan attended Cromer Academy (at the time, Cromer High School) from 2000-2007.

References 

Academies in Norfolk
Cromer
Secondary schools in Norfolk
Inspiration Trust